T. R. Paarivendhar (also known as T. R. Pachamuthu) is an Indian politician and Indhiya Jananayaga Katchi MP to the 17th Lok Sabha from Perambalur Lok Sabha constituency, Tamil Nadu.

He is well known as the founder chairman of the SRM Group of educational institutions.

Political career 
He contested and won the  2019 Indian general election on DMK's Rising Sun symbol being an Indhiya Jananayaga Katchi party member. His party contested along with the Bharatiya Janata Party in the 2016 Tamil Nadu Legislative Assembly election. In 2019 he walked out of the AIADMK-BJP alliance after the Pattali Makkal Katchi joined it. His party allied with Kamal Hassan's Makkal Needhi Maiam during the 2021 Tamil Nadu Legislative Assembly election.

References

India MPs 2019–present
Lok Sabha members from Tamil Nadu
Living people
Dravida Munnetra Kazhagam politicians
Year of birth missing (living people)
People from Perambalur district
Tamil Nadu politicians